The Syrian Virtual University (SVU) is a Syrian educational institution established by the Syrian Ministry of Higher Education. It provides virtual education (using the Internet) to students from around the world. It was established on 2 September 2002 and is the first virtual education institution in the region, and as of 2006, remains the only one. The goals of the SVU include offering education to those who want to learn but cannot afford to do so by going to a "brick and mortar" university. It is headquartered at the Ministry of Higher Education building, Damascus. Students can study online, but they should make exams in one of  the centres accredited by the University inside and outside Syria.

Academic programs
SVU provides bachelor programs - master programs - training courses.

Domestic Programs
All domestic programs are provided in Arabic (except for the English HND), some courses are taught in English. Originally, all domestic SVU programs were related to Computer Science, but two new programs in Economics were added in 2007. There is currently a total of six domestic degree programs.

2-year Undergraduate Programs
 HND stands for the Higher National Diploma in Computing and Business Applications. It is offered in English and Arabic. The duration of study is two years. HND is available in two versions, one taught in Arabic and another in English.

5-year Undergraduate Programs
 ITE (Information Technology Engineering) program aims to prepare IT engineers in general, and specifically IT engineers specialized in Software Engineering, Artificial Intelligence, or Computer Systems and Networks, and possessing the basic knowledge and skills in these engineering sciences. This is done by providing an appropriate environment for the application of modern teaching methods that motivate the student to collect, analyze, set up and generate solutions, and be able to innovate and modernize; and to provide students through this environment with the necessary theoretical and practical knowledge needed by information engineers.

 ISE (deprecated) is a credit-based BSc program in Information Systems Engineering. The content is very much that of a traditional Computer Science degree, but offered online. The student has to take a number of "core courses" and then a number of "specialized courses" with the aid of a career planner. There are currently (as of 2008) four core specialization areas: Software Application Development, Multimedia Systems, Networking and Operating Systems, and Intelligent Systems. It is possible to choose an emphasis within a core specialization area. A student must complete requirements in one or more specialization areas to graduate. The duration of study is (typically) five years.

Undergraduate Programs:
 BAIT is a program leading to a Bachelor degree in Information Technology.
 BSCE is a Bachelor in Economics, with three possible branches: Business Administration, Banking and Finance, and Marketing. Duration of study is four years.
 BL is a Bachelor in law, with several specializations, including criminal and constitutional law.
BMC is a Bachelor in Mass Communication, this program seeks to fulfill its message by providing distinguished academic services in the field of media qualification in Syria.
EDUC is a Bachelor in Educational Habilitation Diploma
TIC is Technological Institute of Computer, A certified assistant qualification in the field of software and information systems.

Postgraduate Programs
 MBA degree. The Duration is two years. The total tuition cost is around $3500.
 Academic master's degree in Technology Management, with an emphasis on technology transfer, development through technology and application of new technologies in businesses, industries and societies.
 Master in Quality (MIQ). The Duration is two years. The total tuition cost is around $3500.
 Master in Building Information Modeling and Management (BIMM)
 Master in Technology Management (PMTM)
 Master in web technology (MWT).
 Master in Web Sciences (MWS)
 Master in Business Administration (MBA)
 Master in Medical Education (MedE)
 Master Degree in Integration of Technology in Education (MITE)
 Master Degree in International Humanitarian Law (MHL)
 Master Degree in Bio Informatics (BIS)
 Master Degree in Integrated Management of Natural Resources (IMNR)

 Doctoral Program

Controversy and Acceptance

Internet Access
Now that students have a wide choice of affordable internet connections that can accommodate the e-learning software requirements, starting as low as US$10 a month, students can use 3G Internet anywhere in Syria via the mobile phone network or they can register for ADSL service which has become openly available from US$30/month.

While today not a problem, one of the issues which the SVU faced during its launch phase was the lack of a proper broad-band Internet infrastructure in Syria. This can be viewed as a strategic problem, as it hinders potential students. Faced with the terrible performance of the teleconferencing software on Dial-Up (the only available option at the time), the university created a number of telecenters (at great expense) in different Syrian governorates so that students who lacked broadband Internet (virtually all of them) could attend their lessons comfortably. With the introduction of ADSL and ISDN in 2004, it was hoped that the severity of the problem would be ameliorated. Unfortunately, the situation has not improved much: up to the end of 2007, ADSL was not yet available to students and the general public. Subscriptions were fewer than 5000 throughout Syria as the cost for any potential adopter was too high (the actual going rate for an ADSL line was almost $1000, due to unavailability and very great demand by internet cafes). ISDN, while difficult to attain in many areas, is more publicly available than ADSL, and thus is the only option for many Syrian SVU students who wish to attend lessons from their homes. Most Syrian SVU students attend their lessons from a local telecenter.
However, starting from 2011; ADSL in Syria costs much less than previously (4M ADSL Subscription costs approximately 4$ which permits a student to attend classes). Now you can connect to ADSL from almost every home in any area. This greatly benefited the university, demonstrated by the fact that it's one of the main 5 universities in Syria now.

External links
The Syrian Virtual University Website (Arabic, French, and English)

Virtual
Syrian educational websites
Educational institutions established in 2002
2002 establishments in Syria